"Under the Mistletoe" is a duet by American singers Kelly Clarkson and Brett Eldredge. It was written by Clarkson and Aben Eubanks, who co-produced it with Jesse Shatkin. "Under the Mistletoe" was first issued by Atlantic Records on October 28, 2020. The song is also included on Clarkson's second Christmas album When Christmas Comes Around... (2021).

Composition and reception
"Under the Mistletoe" is a Christmas pop song written by Clarkson and Aben Eubanks, who produced the track with longtime collaborator Jesse Shatkin. Clarkson invited Eldredge to record the song with her, saying that she was "impressed by his classic sound on his Christmas record so it was a perfect match." Eldredge immediately accepted the invitation, he remarked, "I was blown away by the soul and joy that it brought into my life the moment I heard it."

Reviewing the track for Vulture, Rebecca Alter opined that the song may not be the best Clarkson Christmas song about finding a man underneath a plant, but nonetheless wrote that the song is "very good as well, going for that throwback, A Christmas Gift for You from Phil Spector sound that most Christmas songs have if they want to signal that they're "Christmas!"". George Griffiths of the Official Charts Company opined that the track "packs enough pep to take you all the way through to the big day."

Music video
The accompanying music video premiered on December 10, 2020, and was directed by Jay Martin. The video is a cartoon animated by Ingenuity Studios.

Personnel
Credits adapted from Spotify metadata.

 Vocals – Kelly Clarkson
 Vocals – Brett Eldredge
 Drums – Aaron Redfield
 Engineer, guitar, keyboards, producer – Aben Eubanks
 Engineer – Andy Taub
 Masterer – Chris Gehringer
 Ukulele – Erick Serna
 Trombone – Jeffery Miller
 Bass, keyboards, engineer, producer, additional and drum programming – Jesse Shatkin
 Engineer – John Hanes
 Baritone saxophone – Katty Rodriguez
 Brass arrangement, trumpet – Keyon Harrold
 Tenor saxophone – Marcus Strickland
 Additional engineer, strings programming – Sam Dent
 Assistant engineer – Sam Wahl
 Mixer – Serban Ghenea

Charts

Weekly charts

Year-end charts

Release history

See also
Wrapped in Red
 Glow
 "Christmas Eve"

References

2020 songs
2020 singles
American Christmas songs
Atlantic Records singles
Kelly Clarkson songs
Brett Eldredge songs
Songs written by Kelly Clarkson
Song recordings produced by Jesse Shatkin